Toni Llobet is a Catalan artist and illustrator of several bird and wildlife books, including the New Catalan Breeding Bird Atlas, Handbook of the Birds of the World and the Handbook of the Mammals of the World.

References

Living people
Artists from Catalonia
Writers from Catalonia
Catalan-language writers
21st-century Spanish writers
Year of birth missing (living people)